The Toronto City School District is a public school district based in Toronto, Ohio, United States.

Schools currently in operation by the school district

See also
List of school districts in Ohio

External links
Toronto City Schools – Official site.

Education in Jefferson County, Ohio
School districts in Ohio